George Landow is the name of:

 George Landow (professor) (born 1940), British critic and theorist of hypermedia
 George Landow (filmmaker) (1944–2011), American painter, writer, photographer, and filmmaker